Weizong is an imperial temple name accorded to several Chinese monarchs. It may refer to:

Emperor Huan of Han (132–168), temple name Weizong abolished in 190 by Emperor Xian
Emperor Wenxuan of Northern Qi (526–559), temple name changed to Weizong in 565 and changed back to Xianzu in 570
Chongzhen Emperor (1611–1644), the last emperor of the Ming dynasty who had many temple names including Weizong which was given by Zhu Yujian

Temple name disambiguation pages